Société des Acadiens v Association of Parents is a  Supreme Court of Canada decision on minority language rights under section 19(2) of the Canadian Charter of Rights and Freedoms. The majority of the Court held that in civil cases in the New Brunswick courts, the parties have the right to use either French or English in all submissions and pleadings.  However, they do not have a right to have the matter heard by a judge who understands them in the language they choose to speak.  It is sufficient if there is simultaneous translation.  In addition to the majority decision, two other justices of the Court held that the parties did have the right to be heard and understood by the judge in the language of their choice, but on the facts of the case, that standard was met.

Decision
Justice Beetz, writing for the majority, held that the language rights of section 19(2) were different from most other rights in the Charter as they were the result of a political compromise and so must be read restrictively. The right to be tried in court in French does not even imply a right to an interpreter. The only right to be understood would be provided by fundamental justice and sections 7 and 14 of the Charter rather than language rights.

Aftermath
The decision inspired criticism.  Professors Leslie Green and Denise Réaume call it "troubling," noting the division of the Charter between rights to be read conservatively and liberally was not specific and so other rights besides the language rights were at risk of being conservatively read.  Moreover, they questioned the meaning of conservative readings and said that even with supposed generous readings of the Charter, it is expected that courts are not making law.

Green also argued that when it comes to diminishing rights due to compromise and politics,

This decision was eventually reconsidered in R v Beaulac, [1999] 1 S.C.R. 768 where the Court rejected the Beetz interpretation in favour of the case's minority decision of Dickson and Wilson.

References

External links
 full text from LexUM
 case summary at mapleleafweb.com 

Supreme Court of Canada cases
Canadian Charter of Rights and Freedoms case law
Bilingualism in Canada
1986 in Canadian case law
Language case law